Suzette Haden Elgin (born Patricia Anne Suzette Wilkins; November 18, 1936 – January 27, 2015) was an American researcher in experimental linguistics, construction and evolution of languages and poetry and science fiction writer. She founded the Science Fiction Poetry Association and is considered an important figure in the field of science fiction constructed languages. Her best-known non-fiction includes her Verbal Self-Defense series.

Life
Patricia Anne Suzette Wilkins was born in 1936 in Jefferson City, Missouri.

She attended the University of California, San Diego (UCSD) in the 1960s, and began writing science fiction in order to pay tuition. She gained a PhD in linguistics, and was the first UCSD student ever to write two dissertations (on English and Navajo).

She created the engineered language Láadan for her Native Tongue science fiction series. A grammar and dictionary was published in 1985. She supported feminist science fiction, saying "women need to realize that SF is the only genre of literature in which it's possible for a writer to explore the question of what this world would be like if you could get rid of [Y], where [Y] is filled in with any of the multitude of real world facts that constrain and oppress women. Women need to treasure and support science fiction."

In addition, she published works of shorter fiction. Overlying themes in her work include feminism, linguistics and the impact of proper language, and peaceful coexistence with nature. Many of her works also draw from her Ozark background and heritage.

Later years and death
Elgin became a professor at San Diego State University (SDSU). She retired in 1980 and lived in Arkansas with her second husband, George Elgin. She died at age 78 in 2015 from undisclosed causes. She was survived by her husband. Her son Michael pre-deceased her.

Bibliography

Fiction

Coyote Jones series
The Communipaths (1970)
Furthest (1971)
At the Seventh Level (1972) (cover and interior illustrations by George Barr)
Star-Anchored, Star-Angered (1979); 
Yonder Comes the Other End of Time (1986);  (also in The Ozark series )

The Ozark Trilogy (1981)
Twelve Fair Kingdoms; 
The Grand Jubilee; 
And Then There'll Be Fireworks; 
Yonder Comes the Other End of Time (1986);  (also in the Coyote Jones series )

Native Tongue series
Native Tongue (1984); 
The Judas Rose (1987); 
Earthsong (1993);

Other
Peacetalk 101 (2003);

Short stories
"For the Sake of Grace" – Fantasy & Science Fiction, 1969 (inspired the novel The Two of Them by Joanna Russ)
"Old Rocking Chair's Got Me" – Fantasy & Science Fiction, 1974
"Modulation in All Things" – Reflections of the Future anthology, 1975 
"Lest Levitation Come Upon Us" – Perpetual Light anthology, 1982 (reprinted in The Year's Best Fantasy Stories: 9 anthology, 1983)
"Magic Granny Says Don't Meddle" – Fantasy & Science Fiction, 1984
"School Days" – Light Years and Dark anthology, 1984
"Chico Lafleur Talks Funny" – A Treasury of American Horror Stories, 1985
"Lo, How an Oak E'er Blooming" – Fantasy & Science Fiction, 1986
"Hush My Mouth" – Alternative Histories: 11 Stories of the World as It Might Have Been, edited by Charles G. Waugh and Martin H. Greenberg, 1986
"Tornado" – Fantasy & Science Fiction, 1989
"What the EPA Don't Know Won't Hurt Them" – Fantasy & Science Fiction, 1990
"Only A Housewife" – Fantasy & Science Fiction, 1995
"Soulfedge Rock" – Space Opera anthology, 1996
"Weather Bulletin" – 1999
"Honor Is Golden" – Analog, 2003
"We have always spoken Panglish"- SciFi.com, 2004 (Panglish appears in Native Tongue) 
"What We Can See Now, Looking in the Glass" – Glorifying Terrorism, 2007

Poetry
The Less Said: A Book of Poems (1965)
"McLuhan Transposed" – Burning with a Vision anthology, 1968
"Lexical Gap" – Isaac Asimov's Science Fiction Magazine, 1985
"Presuppositional Ghostbusting" – Isaac Asimov's Science Fiction Magazine, 1985
"Rocky Road to Hoe" – Star*Line, 1987 
"Binary Addendum" – Star*Line, 1989

Songs (partial list)
Dead Skunk Song
Song at the Ready
When I Was a Young Girl (lyrics only, to the tune of "The Ash Grove")
Where the Emerald Kudzu Twines
The World They Call Terra
Down in Holes (lyrics only, to the tune of "Frère Jacques")
The Firelizard Song
The Seas of Space

Nonfiction

The Gentle Art of Verbal Self-Defense
The Gentle Art of Verbal Self-Defense (1980); 
More on the Gentle Art of Verbal Self-Defense (1983); 
The Gentle Art of Verbal Self-Defense Workbook (1987)
The Last Word on the Gentle Art of Verbal Self-Defense (1987); 
Language in Emergency Medicine (1987); 
The Gentle Art of Verbal Self Defense (Paperback; 1988; Barnes & Noble);  
Growing Civilized Kids in a Savage World (1989)
The Gentle Art of Verbal Self-Defense for Business Success (1989); 
Success with the Art of Verbal Self-Defense (1989); 
Staying Well with the Gentle Art of Verbal Self-Defense (1990); 
GenderSpeak (1993); 
The Gentle Art of Written Self-Defense (1993); 
The Gentle Art of Written Self-Defense Letter Book (1993); 
Language in Law Enforcement (1993); 
Linguistics & Science Fiction Sampler (1994)
Mastering the Gentle Art of Verbal Self-Defense (1995-05; Unabridged; audio-cassette); 
BusinessSpeak (1995); 
"You Can't Say That To Me!" (1995); 
The Gentle Art of Communicating with Kids (1996); 
How to Disagree Without Being Disagreeable (1997-03; Wiley); 
How to Turn the Other Cheek and Still Survive in Today's World (1997); 
The Gentle Art of Verbal Self-Defense at Work (2000-01-19; Second Edition; Prentice Hall); 
The Gentle Art of Verbal Self-Defense: Revised and Updated (2009);

Other
A Guide to Transformational Grammar (with John Grinder) (1973); 
What is Linguistics? (1973); 
Bully for Us (with John Grinder) (1974)
Pouring Down Words (1975); 
A Primer of Transformational Grammar for Rank Beginners (1975); 
Never Mind the Trees (1980)
The Great Grammar Myth (1982)
A First Dictionary and Grammar of Láadan (1985, 2nd ed. 1988); 
Try to Feel It My Way (1997); 
The Grandmother Principles (1998); 
The Language Imperative (2000);

References

 Mohr, Dunja M. Worlds Apart: Dualism and Transgression in Contemporary Female Dystopias. Jefferson, NC, McFarland, 2005. [extensive chapter on Native Tongue series]

External links
Official site
Official blog at LiveJournal

Suzette Haden Elgin  at the Encyclopedia of Science Fiction
"Why a Woman Is Not Like a Physicist" Elgin's Guest of Honor speech at WisCon 6 (March 6, 1982)
"What the EPA Don't Know Won't Hurt Them" 
Database search for recordings of her songs
Entrevista en español http://escritorasfantastikas.blogspot.com.es/2015/04/entrevista-suzette-haden-elgin.html
¿Por qué una mujer no es como un físico? http://escritorasfantastikas.blogspot.com.es/2015/05/por-que-una-mujer-no-es-como-un-fisico.html

1936 births
2015 deaths
American women bloggers
American bloggers
Linguists from the United States
American science fiction writers
Constructed language creators
San Diego State University faculty
University of California, San Diego alumni
20th-century American novelists
21st-century American writers
20th-century American women writers
21st-century American women writers
Rhysling Award for Best Short Poem winners
Women science fiction and fantasy writers
American women novelists
Place of death missing
Women linguists